Paresi may refer to:

 Paresi language, an Arawakan language of Brazil
 Pareši, a village in Macedonia
 Andrew Paresi, British comedian, writer and musician

See also
 Paresis, a medical condition